Ruslan Polovinko (21 October 1969 – 6 August 1992) was a Ukrainian–Azerbaijani helicopter pilot and lieutenant, who participated in the First Nagorno-Karabakh War within Azerbaijani military. For his actions in the war he was posthumously awarded the title of the National Hero of Azerbaijan.

Biography
Polovinko was born on 21 October 1969, in Zmiiv of the Kharkiv Oblast of Ukraine. In 1987, he enrolled at the Syzran Higher Military Aviation School in Syzran, Russia. After graduating from high school in 1991, he was sent to serve in the Nakhchivan. After the formation of Azerbaijani Air Forces, he continued his service in the Baku Helicopter Squadron.

Military service
From 1991, he began to fight in the First Nagorno-Karabakh War. Polovinko showed high heroism in the battles for Gubadly, Lachin and Aghdere. On 6 August 1992, after the receipt of information about the siege of Azerbaijani military by the Armenian forces on the Kasapet height, the crew of Mi-24 helicopter, consisting of Ruslan Polovinko, Zakir Majidov (commander) and Javanshir Rahimov rushed to help them to evacuate. After flying three sorties of attacking enemy positions and evacuating injured and fallen soldiers, they were shot down on their fourth flight, resulting in the death of all crew members.

Polovinko was posthumously awarded the title of the National Hero of Azerbaijan on 14 September 1992, by the decree no. 204 of the President of Azerbaijan. He was buried in his native town of Zmiiv. Polovinko was single.

References

External links
 Polovinko Ruslan Aleksandroviç

1969 births
1992 deaths
Helicopter pilots
National Heroes of Azerbaijan
Azerbaijani military personnel
Azerbaijani military personnel of the Nagorno-Karabakh War
Azerbaijani military personnel killed in action
Azerbaijani people of Ukrainian descent
Ukrainian military personnel killed in action
People from Zmiiv
Syzran Higher Military Aviation School alumni